Action is an American dark comedy series about a Hollywood producer named Peter Dragon, who is trying to recover from his last box-office failure. It aired on Fox during the 1999–2000 season. The series was critically praised for its irreverent and sometimes hostile look at Hollywood culture. Thirteen episodes were produced. The show was created by Chris Thompson and the show runner was Don Reo. Future Saturday Night Live cast member Will Forte was the story editor for twelve episodes, and wrote three.

Characters

Main
 Peter Dragon, played by Jay Mohr, is the head of Dragonfire Films. Peter got his start as a screenwriter for gay pornography, but eventually moved up the ladder of Hollywood as a hotshot producer of tasteless action films. Under tremendous pressure to make his next film a big success, Peter is bossy, arrogant, and unscrupulous.
 Wendy Ward, played by Illeana Douglas, is a former child actress as the cute star of the TV show, The Elephant Princess (not to be confused with The Elephant Princess). She had been a teen cocaine addict, and is now a high priced hooker with a heart of gold. Peter names her Vice President of Production at Dragonfire Films and has a romantic open relationship.
 Lonnie Dragon, played by Buddy Hackett, is Peter's uncle and chief of security at Dragonfire Films. Lonnie and Peter seem to understand each other perfectly.
 Stuart Glazer, played by Jack Plotnick, is President of Production at Dragonfire Films. Stuart desperately wants to be taken seriously as a Hollywood developer, but is frequently abused and ordered around by Peter. In spite of his important sounding position, Stuart is often asked to do demeaning tasks like babysit Georgia, have suits dry-cleaned, and order gift baskets for star talent.
 Adam Rafkin, played by Jarrad Paul, is a Jewish struggling screenwriter whose screenplay, Beverly Hills Gun Club, was picked up by Dragonfire Films for development. Adam's script was actually bought mistakenly by Dragonfire Films because his name was confused with the much better known writer Adam Rifkin.

Supporting 
 Action heavily uses celebrity cameo appearances, portraying themselves.
 Asher, played by John Vargas is the eurotrash maître d' that runs the high-end restaurant where every power player in town lunches. Getting the right table is vital, and Asher wields his power with the same aplomb as Peter does. Watching Peter squirm is one of Asher's delights.
 Bobby Gianopolis, played by Lee Arenberg is the chief executive of the unnamed movie studio. He uses menacing threats to get what he wants from Dragonfire, such as withdrawing his massive financial backing or exposing his gigantic penis. He is homosexual, but married Jane, Peter's ex-wife, to quell any rumors of such. Many critics have suggested that Bobby is a parody of former FOX CEO Barry Diller.
 Jane Dragon, played by Cindy Ambuehl, is Peter's ex-wife. She remarried with Bobby Gianopolis mostly to spite Peter. She is manipulative, scheming, and is so orally gifted she can hum and whistle at the same time. She has a daughter by Peter named Georgia and was pregnant with his second child, unknown to him.
 Georgia Dragon, played by Sara Paxton, is Peter's daughter by Jane. Ten years old, she is deceptively innocent but mildly stone-hearted for her age, a trait she gets from her parents.
 Jenny, played by Erin Daniels, is a struggling Hollywood career woman. She used to work at UPN, but after having sex with Peter, moved on to become a production assistant at Dragonfire Films, where she then had sex with Wendy. She is in competition with Stuart.
 Cole Riccardi, played by Richard Burgi, is a famous action star who has been in many of Peter's movies. He is introspective, self-obsessed and secretly gay.
 Connie Hunt, played by Amy Aquino, is the aggressive publicist assigned to Peter Dragon by Bobby Gianapolis after a major public relations disaster. She is dry, practical, and cold-hearted.
 Titus Scroad, played by R. Lee Ermey is an eccentric American movie director loosely parodying real-life Italian director Tinto Brass (albeit lightly crossed with Terrence Malick). He has a predilection for hydro-colonic therapy and tends to accentuate his bravado by grabbing his listener's testicles.
 Holden van Dorn, played by Fab Filippo is a hotshot young actor, with a very public record of alcohol and drug abuse.
 Reagan Lauren Busch, played by Jennifer Lyons is a sexy starlet with an anxious appetite and recurrent weight problems.

Theme song
The song in the opening credits, "Even A Dog Can Shake Hands", was performed by Warren Zevon from his album Sentimental Hygiene.

Episodes

Reception
Caryn James of The New York Times said "the show is truly subversive and daring in its scabrous attitude".  Tom Shales of The Washington Post called it "the most daring and outrageous new comedy of the season", and The Seattle Times called it "a dead-on satire of lost souls in the entertainment biz, with enough boldness to qualify for cable viewing". Ken Tucker of Entertainment Weekly gave the series a grade of B, saying, "Action shreds Hollywood corporate culture more viciously than current big-screen spoofs like Bowfinger and The Muse. The difference is, Actions acid heartlessness renders it a more artful but ultimately less likable piece of work."

David Zurawik of The Baltimore Sun found the series insulting and the pilot episode in particular to be culturally insensitive. He wondered whether audiences are supposed to identify with or despise Peter Dragon.

Broadcast and syndication
Fox canceled it due to ratings. Of the 13 produced episodes, only 8 ran on Fox in 1999. The remaining five episodes were eventually broadcast on other networks such as FX and Comedy Central. This is the first Fox series to receive a TV-MA rating.

The show reran on IFC from 2012 to 2013.

Home media 
On February 21, 2006, Sony Pictures Home Entertainment released the complete series on DVD in Region 1.

On August 27, 2013, it was announced that Mill Creek Entertainment had acquired the rights to various series from the Sony Pictures Television library including Action.  The complete series was subsequently re-released on April 1, 2014.

As of March 2009, the show can be purchased on iTunes.

References

External links
 
 

1990s American LGBT-related comedy television series
1990s American single-camera sitcoms
1999 American television series debuts
1999 American television series endings
American LGBT-related sitcoms
English-language television shows
Fox Broadcasting Company original programming
Television series about show business
Television series by Sony Pictures Television
Television shows set in Los Angeles
1990s American black comedy television series
1990s American satirical television series
Warren Zevon